Club Silvio Pettirossi, is a Paraguayan football club based in the barrio of Republicano, in Asunción. The club was founded March 11, 1926 and plays in the fourth division of the Paraguayan league. Their home games are played at the Bernabé Pedrozo stadium. The club's name was chosen in honor of Silvio Pettirossi, a famous Paraguayan airplane pilot and aviation pioneer.

In 2007 they won the Intermedia (Paraguayan second division tournament) and will thus be in the top flight of Paraguayan football in 2008. They have named former Paraguayan star Miguel Angel Benitez as head coach for the 2008 season.

Honours
Paraguayan Second Division: 2
1969, 2007

Paraguayan Third Division: 7
1952, 1957, 1973, 1974, 1984, 1995, 2004

Current Roster 2009

Notable players
 2000's
  Osvaldo Mendoza (2008)

References

External links
Club Silvio Pettirossi Info

Silvio Pettirossi
Silvio Pettirossi
Association football clubs established in 1926
1926 establishments in Paraguay